Philotheca tomentella is a species of flowering plant in the family Rutaceae and is endemic to the south-west of Western Australia. It is an undershrub with small club-shaped to cylindrical leaves and white flowers with a pale red central stripe, arranged singly or in groups of up to four on the ends of branchlets.

Description
The ten stamens are free from each other and the anthers have a prominent white appendage.

Taxonomy
This species was first described in 1904 by Ludwig Diels and Ernst Georg Pritzel who gave it the name Erisotemon tomentellus in Botanische Jahrbücher für Systematik, Pflanzengeschichte und Pflanzengeographie. In 1998, Paul Wilson changed the name to Philotheca tomentella in the journal Nuytsia.

Distribution and habitat
This philotheca grows in shrubland on sand between the Murchison Ranges, Lake Grace and Queen Victoria Spring area in the south-west of Western Australia.

Conservation status
Philotheca tomentella is classified as "not threatened" by the Government of Western Australia Department of Parks and Wildlife.

References

Plants described in 1920
Rosids of Western Australia
tomentella
Sapindales of Australia
Taxa named by Ludwig Diels